Xinan  is a town situated in the Lufeng District of Shanwei City, Guangdong, China.

See also
List of township-level divisions of Guangdong

References

Township-level divisions of Guangdong